Maxime Demontfaucon (born 3 November 1993) is a French lightweight rower. He won a gold medal at the 2017 World Rowing Championships in Sarasota, Florida with the lightweight men's quadruple scull.

References

1993 births
Living people
French male rowers
World Rowing Championships medalists for France
21st-century French people